The following is a list of stripped Olympic medals. The International Olympic Committee (IOC) is the governing body of the Olympic Games, and as such, can rule athletes to have violated regulations of the Games, for which athletes' Olympic medals can be stripped (i.e., rescinded). Stripped medals must be returned to the IOC by the offending athlete.

Record
In the case of team events, the rule was revised in March 2003 so that the IOC can strip medals from a team based on infractions by a single team member. In the table below, for stripped team medals, the athlete in violation is shown in parentheses. The international governing body of each Olympic sport can also strip athletes of medals for infractions of the rules of the sport.

From October 1968 to December 2022, a total of 154 medals have been stripped, with 9 medals declared vacant (rather than being reallocated) after being stripped. The vast majority of these have occurred since 2000 due to improved drug testing methods.

The majority of medals have been stripped in athletics (53, including 21 gold medals) and weightlifting (51, including 15 gold medals). The country with the most stripped medals is Russia (and Russian associated teams), with 48, four times the number of the next highest, and more than 30% of the total. The Post-Soviet states account for more than 60% of the overall total.

Though no athletes were caught doping at the 1980 Summer Olympics, it has been claimed that athletes had begun using testosterone and other drugs for which tests had not yet been developed. A 1989 report by a committee of the Australian Senate claimed that "there is hardly a medal winner at the Moscow Games, certainly not a gold medal winner...who is not on one sort of drug or another: usually several kinds. The Moscow Games might well have been called the Chemists' Games".

A member of the IOC Medical Commission, Manfred Donike, privately ran additional tests with a new technique for identifying abnormal levels of testosterone by measuring its ratio to epitestosterone in urine. Twenty percent of the specimens he tested, including those from sixteen gold medalists, would have resulted in disciplinary proceedings had the tests been official. The results of Donike's unofficial tests later convinced the IOC to add his new technique to their testing protocols. The first documented case of "blood doping" occurred at the 1980 Summer Olympics as a runner was transfused with two pints of blood before winning medals in the 5000 m and 10,000 m.

Among particular Olympic Games, the 2008 Summer Olympics has the most stripped medals, at 50. Among Winter Olympics, the 2002 Winter Olympics has the most medals stripped with 13.

All but eight of the stripped medals involve infractions stemming from doping and drug testing:
 Jim Thorpe was stripped of his two gold medals by the International Olympic Committee in 1913, after the IOC learned that Thorpe had taken expense money for playing baseball before the 1912 Games, violating Olympic amateurism rules that had been in place at the time. In 1982, 29 years after his death, the IOC was convinced that the disqualification had been improper, as no protest against Thorpe's eligibility had been brought within the required 30 days, and reinstated Thorpe's medals, with replicas presented to his children. 
 Marika Kilius and Hans-Jürgen Bäumler were stripped of their 1964 silver medal in figure skating for similar reasons to Thorpe, but had them reinstated in 1987.
 Ingemar Johansson was disqualified from the gold medal fight in the 1952 heavyweight boxing competition after the referee deemed that he was "failing to show fight" to win the three-round match, and was subsequently deemed to have forfeited the minimum silver medal he would have won. Johansson said that he did not throw any punches at his opponent in the first two rounds to tire him out before releasing a barrage of punches in the third. He was eventually presented with his silver medal in 1982.
Ibragim Samadov of the 1992 Unified Team was stripped of his bronze medal after he "hurled his bronze medal to the floor" and "stormed off the stage during the awards ceremony."
Ara Abrahamian of Sweden was stripped of his bronze medal in 2008 for similar reasons to Samadov. 
 In 2010, China was stripped of a team gymnastics bronze medal from 2000 after Dong Fangxiao was found to have been underage at the time of the competition.
 In 2022, the women's ski cross event results were revised nine days after the event and a week after the Games had ended, following an appeal by Fanny Smith, who was penalised for causing contact during the final. She replaced Daniela Maier for bronze upon the FIS appeal panel decision. The two athletes and their sporting federations later agreed to share third place and Maier's bronze medal was restored.

Some athletes have had medals taken away from them for different methods of cheating before physically getting on to the medal podium, such as American marathon runner Frederick Lorz at the 1904 Olympics and Swedish horse rider Bertil Sandström at the 1932 Olympics. These athletes are not included in the list as they were disqualified before physically receiving their medals, and in any case were never guaranteed to win them going in to the final round of competition.

Russian wrestler Besik Kudukhov failed a drug test in 2016 from a sample taken when he competed in the 60 kg freestyle wrestling event at the 2012 Olympics. However, as Kudukhov had died in a car accident three years earlier, his medal was retained.

In a few cases, the IOC has reversed earlier rulings that stripped athletes of medals.

In the case of Rick DeMont, the United States Olympic Committee (USOC) recognized his gold medal performance in the 1972 Summer Olympics in 2001,
but only the IOC has the power to restore his medal, and it has, as of 2021, refused to do so. DeMont originally won the gold medal in the 400m freestyle, but the International Olympic Committee (IOC) stripped him of his gold medal after his post-race urinalysis tested positive for traces of the banned substance ephedrine contained in his prescription asthma medication, Marax. The positive test also deprived him of a chance at multiple medals, as he was not permitted to swim in any other events at the 1972 Olympics, including the 1,500-meter freestyle for which he was the then-current world record-holder. Before the Olympics, DeMont had properly declared his asthma medications on his medical disclosure forms, but the U.S. Olympic Committee (USOC) had not cleared them with the IOC's medical committee.

List of stripped Olympic medals
 This is the list of Olympic medals stripped by the IOC, the governing body of the Olympics.
 (X) medal declared vacant
 (Y) medal yet to be reallocated or declared vacant
 (Z) not due to doping; all others were due to doping offenses

Notes:

List of Olympic medals stripped and later returned
Here is the list of Olympic medals that were stripped by the IOC and later returned by the IOC.

Stripped, returned, and stripped
Gold medals for the 2000 Olympic men's 4 × 400 metres relay were awarded to the U.S. squad of Jerome Young, Michael Johnson, Antonio Pettigrew, Angelo Taylor, Alvin Harrison and Calvin Harrison. In 2004, after Young (who ran in the heats) was retroactively banned from 1999 to 2001, all six were stripped of their medals.

In 2005, the Court of Arbitration for Sport restored the medals of the remaining five due to the fact that, according to the rules of the time, a team should not be disqualified because of a doping offense of an athlete who did not compete in the finals, but in 2008, Pettigrew admitted to the use of doping from 1997 to 2003, meaning that the team was disqualified.

Medals stripped by country
A total of 37 countries/teams have had medals stripped including the former Soviet Union, the Unified Team of 1992 and the Olympic Athletes from Russia team of 2018. In total, 63% of all medals stripped are from former Soviet states.

Medals stripped by gender
Men have had more medals stripped overall. Men have also had more gold and bronze medals stripped, but women have had more silver medals stripped. However, based on percentages men and women have had medals stripped at similar rates.

Mixed events will be classed in the table below on which gender caused the medal to be stripped. If both genders contribute to the medal being stripped, then it should be added to both tallies. Note that Marion Jones' stripped relay medals are not counted.

Medals stripped by sport
A total of 18 different sports have had medals stripped: 13 from the Summer Olympics and 5 from the Winter Olympics. Athletics and Weightlifting have had by far the greatest numbers of medals stripped compared to any other sport.

See also
 All-time Olympic Games medal table
 Doping at the Olympic Games
 List of doping cases in sport

Notes

References

External links
 Drug testing at the Sydney Olympics

 
Stripped
Stripped